Coleophora acutipennella is a moth of the family Coleophoridae. It is found in the United States, including California.

References

acutipennella
Moths described in 1882
Moths of North America